Edmund James Flynn (November 16, 1847 – June 7, 1927) was a Canadian politician and the tenth premier of Quebec, from 1896 to 1897.

Background

Flynn, the son of Jacques Flynn and Elizabeth Tostevin, was born at Percé on November 16, 1847. He studied law at the Université Laval in Quebec City from 1871 to 1873, obtaining his degree with distinction. On 16 Sept. 1873 he was called to the bar of the province of Quebec and he took up his profession in the region where he was born.

Member of the legislature

Flynn became the Liberal Member of the Legislative Assembly (MLA) for the district of Gaspé in 1878.  He crossed the floor in 1879 and joined the Conservative Party, a very controversial move at that time, an action which was shocking in the Gaspé riding where he was a favourite son, and a gallant chivalric-like orator on campaign.  Flynn won re-election each time until 1890.  In that year, Honore Mercier's Parti National won a landslide victory and Flynn lost his seat. Flynn ran for the federal Conservatives in the 1891 federal election for the riding of Quebec County, but lost. Flynn was sent back to the provincial legislature in 1892 and was re-elected in 1897.

Conservative Leader

He succeeded Louis-Olivier Taillon as Conservative Leader, became the tenth Premier of Quebec in 1896. In office he was concerned with public works, Crown Land adjudication and improving the quality of primary education and the compensation for schoolmasters. This short tenure marked the final time that the Conservative Party held power in Quebec.

In the 1897, his government suffered electoral defeat to the more popular Félix-Gabriel Marchand. During the remainder of his term as a legislator, Flynn served as Leader of the Opposition.

Judge

Flynn had taught a course in Roman law at Université Laval in Quebec City from the late 1870s. Flynn had been appointed a judge of the Superior Court for the district of Beauce in June 1914. In June 1920 he was appointed Judge of the Court of King's Bench, an office he held for the rest of his life. Flynn died at Quebec City, June 7, 1927 and his remains were interred in the cimetière Notre-Dame-de-Belmont, Sainte-Foy, Quebec.

Electoral record

See also
List of Gaspésiens
List of Canadian politicians who have crossed the floor
List of Quebec general elections
History of Quebec

References
 

1847 births
1927 deaths
Anglophone Quebec people
Conservative Party of Quebec MNAs
Conservative Party of Canada (1867–1942) candidates for the Canadian House of Commons
Lawyers in Quebec
Premiers of Quebec
People from Gaspésie–Îles-de-la-Madeleine
Quebec people of Irish descent
Quebec political party leaders
Quebec Liberal Party MNAs
Université Laval Faculté de droit alumni
Academic staff of Université Laval